The Quick Call Stakes is a Grade III American Thoroughbred horse race for horses aged three years old over the distance of  furlongs on the turf scheduled annually in July at Saratoga Race Course in Saratoga Springs, New York.  The event currently carries a purse of $175,000.

History 
The race was inaugurated in 2008 and was raced in September. All other times it has been held in either July or early August.

The event is named in honor of Quick Call, the multiple graded stakes winning gelding who won more than half his 16 career victories at the Saratoga Race Course. Quick Call was a dual winner of the GII Forego Handicap, lived to the age of 35 and is buried at Clare Court in Saratoga Springs.

The 2010 running was on the Inner Turf course at a distance of 1 mile.

In 2019 the event was upgraded to Grade III.

Records
Speed record: 
  furlongs – 1:00.80   –  Big Invasion  (2022)

Margins: 
  lengths – Central Banker   (2013) 

Most wins by a jockey:  
 3 – Javier Castellano: (2010, 2015, 2017)
 3 – Joel Rosario: (2013, 2019, 2022)

Most wins by a trainer:
 2 – Linda L. Rice: (2009, 2020)
 2 – Christophe Clement: (2014, 2022)
Most wins by an owner:

 2 – Michael Dubb: (2008, 2018)

Winners 

Legend:

See also
List of American and Canadian Graded races

References 

Graded stakes races in the United States
Grade 3 stakes races in the United States
2008 establishments in New York (state)
Open sprint category horse races
Horse races in New York (state)
Turf races in the United States
Recurring sporting events established in 2008
Saratoga Race Course
Flat horse races for three-year-olds